The 1970 United States Senate election in Missouri took place on November 3, 1970. Incumbent Democratic U.S. Senator Stuart Symington was re-elected to a fourth term in office over Republican John Danforth (who would eventually succeed the retiring Symington in 1976).

Democratic primary

Candidates
Hershel V. Page
Stuart Symington, incumbent Senator since 1953
Lee C. Sutton, former State Representative from Monroe County (1955–61)
William McKinley Thomas
Douglas V. White

Results

Republican primary

Candidates
Doris M. Bass, St. Louis City Alderman
John Danforth, Attorney General of Missouri
Morris Duncan, perennial candidate

Results

American Party primary

Candidates
 Gene Chapman
 Ralph A. DePugh, Jackson County deputy sheriff
 Lawrence "Red" Petty

Results

General election

Results

See also 
 1970 United States Senate elections

References

Missouri
1970
1970 Missouri elections